H10 or H-10 may refer to:

Transportation
 Atlas H-10, a 1948 four-seat cabin monoplane aircraft
 HMS Encounter (H10), a 1934 British Royal Navy E class destroyer
 HMS H10, a 1915 British Royal Navy H class submarine
 PRR H10, a 1916 American 2-8-0 steam locomotives model
 H10 Bletcham Way, UK Road
 London Buses route H10
 Lioré et Olivier LeO H-10, a French seaplane

Other
Haplogroup H10 (mtDNA), a subclade of human mtDNA Haplogroup H (mtDNA)
Hilbert's tenth problem in mathematics
 H10 Hotels, a Spanish hotel chain
 iriver H10 series, a series of portable digital audio players
 DSC-H10, a 2008 Sony Cyber-shot H series camera
 H-10, refrigerant leak detector from Bacharach